Thomas Lyons (18 February 1896 – 16 May 1985) was a unionist politician in Northern Ireland.

Lyons studied at Albert Agricultural College in Glasnevin, then emigrated to Australia in 1922.  He returned to Ireland in 1939, and was elected for the Ulster Unionist Party in North Tyrone in 1943.  At the 1945 general election, he stood unsuccessfully in Fermanagh and Tyrone.  He served as Chairman of Ways and Means and Deputy Speaker of the Northern Ireland House of Commons from 1955 until 1969, when he was deselected by his constituency association and stood down.  In 1961, he served as High Sheriff of County Tyrone.

References

1896 births
1985 deaths
High Sheriffs of Tyrone
Members of the House of Commons of Northern Ireland 1938–1945
Members of the House of Commons of Northern Ireland 1945–1949
Members of the House of Commons of Northern Ireland 1949–1953
Members of the House of Commons of Northern Ireland 1953–1958
Members of the House of Commons of Northern Ireland 1958–1962
Members of the House of Commons of Northern Ireland 1962–1965
Members of the House of Commons of Northern Ireland 1965–1969
Ulster Unionist Party members of the House of Commons of Northern Ireland
Irish emigrants to Australia (before 1923)
Members of the House of Commons of Northern Ireland for County Tyrone constituencies